Towhidlu may refer to:
 Towhidlu, Markazi
 Towhidlu, Zanjan